Chameli Ki Shaadi is a 1986 Hindi-language comedy film directed by Basu Chatterjee starring Anil Kapoor and Amrita Singh. Though it was fairly average at the box office due to low cost, it was critically acclaimed. Over the years, the film has developed a cult following and is one of Basu Chatterjee's most popular works.

Summary
The film is a satire on the caste system in India. Charandas is a bachelor who aspires to become a wrestler. He is training under the tutelage of Mastram Pehelwan, who preaches and practices absolute abstinence. Charan has no problem with his life, but his elder brother Bhajandas and his sister-in-law do. The film is also one of the examples of a female-centric movie where Amrita Singh as the young, headstrong, outspoken Chameli, was acknowledged as the star of the film, and her role was later critiqued to be one of the first takes on the realization of feminine desires and domination in Indian cinema.

One day, however, Charandas runs into Chameli, the daughter of Kallumal, a coal-depot owner. The duo start an affair, which is soon exposed and opposed by both the families, because they are from different castes. Charandas has to take the advice of Adv. Harish. How the lovers find their way out of the situation with help of Harish, Mastram and the friends of the duo forms the story.

Plot
Charandas is a fledgling wrestler who lives with Bhajandas. According to Bhajandas, Charandas should marry and start a family of his own. But Charan is hell bent on becoming a wrestler and is even ready to remain a bachelor until 40 as per the norms of Mastram. However, one day, Charan's thoughts are challenged when he sees Chameli at Kallumal's coal depot. He realizes that to marry her, he may have to leave Mastram's Akhara.

Charan does so and seeks help of Adv. Harish, a close friend of his brother. Harish appreciates Charan's love and is ready to help latter. Charan dares to confess his love to Chameli. On other hand, Anita, Chameli's best friend is also convinced of Chameli's true love. The lover duo start meeting secretly. One day, however, the love affair stands exposed when a relative of Chameli spots the duo in a restaurant.

The respective families soon take up cudgels against their wards and make it clear that they won't allow inter-caste marriage. Chameli is kept under house arrest and her parents decide to have her marry one of their acquaintances. Charan learns of this development. Mastram is surprisingly supportive of Charan's love. He explains that just as bachelorhood is a challenge for would-be wrestlers, a lover should not back out from the challenge posed by the world.

Mastram, along with Charan's friends back the lovers to overcome the obstacles. Here, Champa calls in the help of her rogue brother Chhadam Lal aka Chhadmi against Charan. With help of Harish and all his friends, Charan chalks out a plan to rescue Chameli from her house. As per the plan, Charan abducts Chameli from her own house, while Harish sees to it that the duo legally get married. Charan and Chameli are initially frightened, but Harish convinces them by telling them that as long as people do not dare to marry outside the caste like them, Indians will never be truly united.

Meanwhile, on learning that Chameli is missing, her parents lodge a complaint against Charan. They proceed to the place where Charan and Chameli are going to get married. Meanwhile, Bhajandas also comes with his men to disrupt the marriage. Both the parties have arrived late, as Charandas and Chameli are legally husband and wife now. They vent their ire on Harish, who according to them is responsible for corrupting the duo. Harish takes Kallumal aside and explains that if the marriage is permitted by him, he will garner votes of both the castes in the election because his son in law is the leader of all the young people and also has support from the akhads.

Convinced by the argument of Harish, Kallumal relents because of being enticed by the illusion of winning the local election. Similarly, Harish tells Bhajandas that an influential Kallumal is sure to win the elections. If Bhajandas accepts the marriage, he will get special perks for his coal business thanks to Kallumal. Besides, he will get coal and cement at a subsidized rate from Kallumal. Bhajandas goes greedy and relents. In the end, Chameli and Charandas are united with the blessing from both the parties.

Cast 
 Anil Kapoor as Charandas
 Amrita Singh as Chameli
 Amjad Khan as Advocate Harish
 Om Prakash as Ustad Mastram Pahalwan
 Pankaj Kapur as Kallumal 
 Satyen Kappu as Bhajandas
 Tabassum as Bhajandas's Wife
 Bharati Achrekar as Champa
 Annu Kapoor as Chhadamlal
 Ram Sethi as Nathulal
 Jayshree T. as Gulabo
 Ghanshyam Rohera as Fatchat
 Shail Chaturvedi as Lachchuram Kaphanchi / Makhkhan's father
 Rupini as Anita, Chameli's friend

Soundtrack
The music was composed by Kalyanji–Anandji and lyrics by Prakash Mehra and Anjaan.

External links 

1986 films
1980s Hindi-language films
Films directed by Basu Chatterjee
Indian romantic comedy films
1986 romantic comedy films
Films scored by Kalyanji Anandji
Films about the caste system in India
Indian satirical films